Kenedy Silva Reis, commonly known as Keninha Goiano or Keninha (born November 25, 1985), is an attacking midfielder.

Career
Keninha Goiano is a player who has gone through several small clubs in Goiás, São Paulo and other states to reach the Atlético Goianiense. In January 2013, he signed a 6-month contract with Qatari club Al-Sailiya.

Contract
 Atlético Goianiense.

References

External links
ogol

1985 births
Living people
Brazilian footballers
Atlético Clube Goianiense players
Goiânia Esporte Clube players
Guaratinguetá Futebol players
Al-Sailiya SC players
Association football midfielders